North Western Province ( Wayamba Paḷāta,  Vada Mael Mākāṇam) is a province of Sri Lanka. The province consists of the districts of Kurunegala and Puttalam. Its capital is Kurunegala, which has a population of 28,571. The province is known mainly for its numerous coconut plantations. Other main towns in this province are Chilaw (24,712) and Puttalam (45,661), which are both small fishing towns. The majority of the population of Wayamba province is of Sinhalese ethnicity. There is also a substantial Sri Lankan Moor minority around Puttalam and Sri Lankan Tamils in Udappu and Munneswaram. Fishing, prawn farming and rubber tree plantations are other prominent industries of the region. The province has an area of 7,888 km2, and a population of 2,370,075 (2011 census).

Geography

Climate
The climate of Wayamba is tropical, with a marked dry season, and temperatures averaging between 20 °C in January to 25 °C in March. The south of the province is wetter, with almost 2000 mm of rainfall per year, but the north of the province is one of the driest regions in Sri Lanka, averaging under 1100 mm of rain in parts.

Districts

Wayamba is divided into 2 districts:
 Kurunegala District 
 Puttalam District

Cities
 Kurunegala (Municipal Council)

Large towns
 Puttalam (Urban Council)
 Kuliyapitiya (Urban Council)
 Chilaw (Urban Council)

Other towns
 Alawwa
 Anamaduwa
 Bingiriya
 Bolawatta
 Dankotuwa
 Galgamuwa
 Giriulla
 Hettipola
 Hiripitiya
 Kalpitiya
 Kumarakattuwa
 Madampe
 Maho
 Marawila
 Narammala
 Nattandiya
 Nikaweratiya
 Pannala
 Polpithigama
 Madurankuli
 Wariyapola
 Wennappuwa
 Pallama
 Polgahawela
 Udappu

Villages
North Western Province contains six villages with the same name, Galagedara.

Education

Universities

 Open University of Sri Lanka, regional centre of Kurunegala
 Wayamba University of Sri Lanka, Kuliyapitiya
 Wayamba National College of Education, Bingiriya

Provincial Education- Provincial Department of Education - North Western

 Zonal Education - Kurunegala
 Zonal Education - Puttalam
 Zonal Education - Kuliyapitiya
 Zonal Education - Chilaw
 Zonal Education - Ibbagamuwa
 Zonal Education - Maho
 Zonal Education - Nikaweratiya
 Zonal Education - Giriulla

Schools
 St. Joseph Vaz College - Wennappuwa
 Presidential Science College - Puttalam
 Holy Family Convent-Marawila
 Saranath College - Kuliyapitiya
 Central College - Kuliyapitiya 
 Maliyadewa College - Kurunegala 
 St. Annes College - Kurunegala 
 Ananda College - Chilaw
 Dhammissara College - Nattandiya
 Wayamba Royal College - Kurunegala 
 Senanayake Central College - Madampe
 Mayurapada College - Narammala
 Sri Sumangala College - Wariyapola 
 S.W.R.D. Bandaranayaka Central College - Panduwasnuwara
 Zahira National College - Puttalam

Transportation

Roads
The region is served by an extensive rail and road transport system providing linkages to the major cities and ports in Sri Lanka. Some major roads include,

 A3: Puttalam – Chilaw – Negombo - Colombo (162 km)
 A6: Ambepussa – Kurunegala – Dambulla – Trincomalee (192 km)
 A10: Katugastota – Kurunegala – Puttalam (125 km)
 A12: Puttalam - Anuradhapura - Trincomalee (179 km)

Railway lines
 Colombo, Ragama Junction, Polgahawela Junction, Kurunegala, Maho Junction, Anuradhapura. Served by the Rajarata Rajini (Queen of North Central Region).
 Colombo, Ragama Junction, Negombo, Chilaw, Puttalam (1926). Served by the Muthu Kumari'' (Pearl Princess). A route of  along the North-Western coast.

Industrial land
Wayamba is the location for Mawathagama and Polghawela Export Processing Zones and boasts several other industrial estates such as Dambadeniya, Makandura West, Makadura East, Pannala, Lunuwila, Heraliyawela, Dangaspitiya, Dankotuwa and Noorani.

Mineral resources
Wayamba Province is also rich with several types of mineral deposits. These include,

 Silica Sand - The best known silica sand deposits are found in the Marawila, Madampe and Nattandiya areas of the province.
 Miocene Limestone - The largest deposits of Miocene limestone are found in the north western coastal belt near Puttalam. The limestones are used for cement manufacturing.
 Graphite (Bogala, Kahatagaha and Dodamgaslanda Graphite mines)
 Mica
 Beach mineral sands including ilmenite
 Clay

Major agricultural crops

Wayamba has a highly developed agricultural economy, growing a variety of fruits and vegetables, flowering plants, spices, oil-seeds in addition to the traditional plantation crops such as Coconut, Rubber and Rice. Rich soils and varied climate give Wayamba a potential for growing of virtually any crop.

Paddy is the main agricultural crop in the province. Wayamba is the third largest paddy-producing area in Sri Lanka. There are two main cultivation seasons. The Maha Season (October–January) or the period with excessive rainfall and the Yala Season (April–August) the drier season. In Yala season, the farmers have to depend on irrigation. More recent times, the paddy farmers during the dry season have opted to cultivate export crops and subsidiary food crops that bring bigger profits.

 Coconut – The largest industry in the Wayamba Province. The extent of land under coconut is 48% of the island's area.
 Paddy
 Cereals – Kurakkan, maize, green gram, cowpea
 Root Crops – sweet potatoes, red onions
 Fruits – Pineapples, Mangoes, Papaya, Banana, Avocado
 Vegetables – Gherkin, Asparagus, and many local vegetables
 Cashew Nut is also cultivated on a large scale in the Wayamba province. Wayamba is a major Cashew exporting region in Sri Lanka. The northernmost dry region is ideally suited for Cashew cultivation.
 Fisheries Industry/ Prawn Farming - The western coast of the North Western region is endowed with rich fisheries and other aquatic resources. The major varieties found in abundance are tuna, prawns, lobsters and cuttlefish. The country's export-oriented commercial prawn farming industry is concentrated in the coastal areas of the Puttalam district.

Banking and financial services
The Wayamba province is well served by all major commercial banking and financial institutions of Sri Lanka. These include, Bank of Ceylon, Commercial Bank of Sri Lanka, Sampath Bank, National Savings Bank, Hatton National Bank, People's Bank, Seylan Bank and the Union Bank. All of these banks have an extensive coverage of their branches in the province. Three other development banks of Sri Lanka, namely The DFCC Bank, National Development Bank, Wayamba Development Bank, Ideal motors & Ideal finance also provide services to the province.

Attractions

Archaeological sites
The Wayamba province is a treasure house of archaeology having been seat of four medieval kingdoms of Sri Lanka between the mid 12th and mid 14th centuries. Having forced to move capitals due to foreign invasions, Sri Lankan kings nevertheless built magnificent citadels are Yapahuwa, Panduwasnuwara, Dambadeniya and Kurunegala. Impressive remains of those citadels, palaces, Buddhist temples and monasteries provide exciting sight seeing to the visitors.

Rock temples
Wayamba and Kurunegala are also the home for other ancient Buddhist rock temples, mostly with 1st century B.C roots, with wall and ceiling frescos, colossal Buddha images, stone inscriptions and sculptures dating from early medieval to 18th century period.

Beaches
The sparkling blue surf of the Indian Ocean and scenic tropical lagoons which edge the western shores of the Wayamba province are glided with 240 kilometres of wide, sun drenched beaches. These beaches stretch from Waikkal at its southern end to Dutch Bay in the Puttalam district.

Some of Wayamba's best resort beaches are at Marawila, Talwila, Kalpitiya and Waikkal. These beaches are often with the bonus of a lagoon or a river front and make excellent bases for stay-put beach holidays. Some of the beach resorts also offer viewing of underwater Coral wonderlands off Kandakuliya and Karaitivu. Many fishing villages dot the coastal areas.

European colonial monuments
The well preserved Dutch Fort in Kalpitiya (Puttalam district) dating back to 1670 is an evidence of the Wayamba's European colonial period. The fort is complete with barracks, store houses and living quarters, Dutch colonial pillars and ancient tombstones. Kurunegala has many 19th century relics of the British colonial period including the government Agent's residence and the Rajapihilla rest house.

Festivals
The people of Wayamba celebrate many traditional festivals centred on sacred shrines of diverse faith.

 All Buddhist temples celebrate the Vesak, Poson and Esela festivals commemorating the events of great importance to the Buddhists. These festivals feature colourful decorations, lanterns, illuminations and pageants where traditional dancing, drumming, costumed dignitaries and elephants are paraded. Two noteworthy colourful Buddhist processions are organised by the Wilbawa Raja Maha Viharaya (Major temple) and Athanda Raja Maha Viharaya and are paraded in the Kurunegala city.
 The St Anne's Roman Catholic church is located on a magnificent beach stretch in Talawila in the Puttalam district. The church draws thousands of pilgrims for its main festivals in March and July.
 The Munneswaram and Udappu Hindu temples are pilgrim centres of many devotees. People gather to worship deities and seek favours. The main temple of God Shiva at Munneswaram, comprises the shrines and has been built according to traditional Hindu style. Munneswaram celebrates its major festival in August where fire-walking is practiced. Udappuwa, a sea side shrine complex of three shrines, also has a colourful festival held in the month of August.
 The Ramazan, Haj and Milad-un-Nabi festivals are also celebrated by the minority Muslims of Wayamba especially at historic and famed mosques in Puttalam, Kurunegala and Chilaw. These celebrations are mainly of religious character, recitations of Koran and distribution of cooked food and sweets.

All three shrines are easily accessible from Kurunegala, - Munneswaram approximately 70 km, Udappuwa 95 km and St. Anne's about 110 km respectively.

Research institutes
 Coconut Research Institute, Lunuwila
 Rice Research and Development Institute, Batalagoda

Sport
 Cricket - Wayamba

See also
 List of settlements in North Western Province (Sri Lanka)
 Provinces of Sri Lanka
 Districts of Sri Lanka

References

External links
 
 North Western Province Postal Codes [complete list of post codes for all towns Sports

and villages of wayamba palatha]
 North-Western Provincial Council at the official website of the government of Sri-Lanka

 
Provinces of Sri Lanka